Holy Disorders is a 1945 detective novel by the British writer Edmund Crispin. It the second in his series featuring the Oxford professor and amateur detective Gervase Fen. The novel is set in 1940 during the early stages of the Second World War. The title is a reference to Chaucer.

Synopsis
After a violent attack on the organist in the small cathedral city of Tolnbridge in Devon, Fen sends a telegram to an acquaintance of his composer, Geoffrey Vintner to hurry down to take over his duties. Before he has even left London Vintner is attacked by an unknown assailant in a department store and has another narrow escape while travelling down on the train from Paddington. Once there he joins up with Fen and together they try and solve two murders in a case that combines witchcraft and a Nazi spy ring.

See also
 Golden Age of Detective Fiction

References

Bibliography
 Ellis, Steve. Chaucer at Large: The Poet in the Modern Imagination. University of Minnesota Press, 2000. 
 Hubin, Allen J. Crime Fiction, 1749-1980: A Comprehensive Bibliography. Garland Publishing, 1984.
 Reilly, John M. Twentieth Century Crime & Mystery Writers. Springer, 2015.

1945 British novels
British mystery novels
British crime novels
Novels by Edmund Crispin
Novels set in Devon
Novels set in London
British detective novels
Victor Gollancz Ltd books